The fundamental theorem of poker is a principle first articulated by David Sklansky that he believes expresses the essential nature of poker as a game of decision-making in the face of incomplete information. 

The fundamental theorem is stated in common language, but its formulation is based on mathematical reasoning. Each decision that is made in poker can be analyzed in terms of the expected value of the payoff of a decision. The correct decision to make in a given situation is the decision that has the largest expected value. If a player could see all of their opponents' cards, they would always be able to calculate the correct decision with mathematical certainty, and the less they deviate from these correct decisions, the better their expected long-term results. This is certainly true heads-up, but Morton's theorem, in which an opponent's correct decision can benefit a player, may apply in multi-way pots.

An example
Suppose Bob is playing limit Texas hold 'em and is dealt 9♣ 9♠ under the gun before the flop. He calls, and everyone else folds to Carol in the big blind who checks. The flop comes A♣ K♦ 10♦, and Carol bets.

Bob now has a decision to make based upon incomplete information. In this particular circumstance, the correct decision is almost certainly to fold. There are too many turn and river cards that could kill his hand. Even if Carol does not have an A or a K, there are 3 cards to a straight and 2 cards to a flush on the flop, and she could easily be on a straight or flush draw. Bob is essentially drawing to 2 outs (another 9), and even if he catches one of these outs, his set may not hold up.

However, suppose Bob knew (with 100% certainty) that Carol held 8♦ 7♦. In this case, it would be correct to raise. Even though Carol would still be getting the correct pot odds to call, the best decision for Bob is to raise. Therefore, by folding (or even calling), Bob has played his hand differently from the way he would have played it if he could see his opponent's cards, and so by the fundamental theorem of poker, his opponent has gained. Bob has made a "mistake", in the sense that he has played differently from the way he would have played if he knew Carol held 8♦ 7♦, even though this "mistake" is almost certainly the best decision given the incomplete information available to him.

This example also illustrates that one of the most important goals in poker is to induce the opponents to make mistakes. In this particular hand, Carol has practiced deception by employing a semi-bluff — she has bet a hand, hoping Bob will fold, but she still has outs even if he calls or raises. Carol has induced Bob to make a mistake.

Multi-way pots and implicit collusion
The Fundamental Theorem of Poker applies to all heads-up decisions, but it does not apply to all multi-way decisions. This is because each opponent of a player can make an incorrect decision, but the "collective decision" of all the opponents works against the player.

This type of situation occurs mostly in games with multi-way pots, when a player has a strong hand, but several opponents are chasing with draws or other weaker hands. Also, a good example is a player with a deep stack making a play that favors a short-stacked opponent because he can extract more expected value from the other deep-stacked opponents. Such a situation is sometimes referred to as implicit collusion. 

The fundamental theorem of poker is simply expressed and appears axiomatic, yet its proper application to the countless varieties of circumstances that a poker player may face requires a great deal of knowledge, skill, and experience.

References

See also
 Poker strategy

Poker gameplay and terminology
Poker strategy